Compsolechia ischnoptera is a moth of the family Gelechiidae. It was described by Edward Meyrick in 1922. It is found in Pará, Brazil.

The wingspan is 9–10 mm. The forewings are dark violet grey with a whitish-ochreous apical patch, its edge running from five-sixths of the costa to the tornus, almost straight, enclosing five irregular dark grey pre-marginal dots. The hindwings are dark fuscous.

References

Moths described in 1922
Compsolechia
Taxa named by Edward Meyrick